An Attempt at a Critique of All Revelation (1792) was the first published work by Johann Gottlieb Fichte. It was briefly mistaken by the public to be a fourth Critique by Immanuel Kant, and thereby gained Fichte much philosophical fame.

In this work, Fichte argued that any revelation in relation to God must be consistent with morality, which was against many aspects of orthodox Christian belief at the time.

Notes and references

External links
Text in English
 Johann Fichte, An Attempt at a Critique of All Revelation, Cambridge, 2010
 Versuch einer Kritik aller Offenbarung, the original German-language text

1792 non-fiction books
Books by Johann Gottlieb Fichte
German non-fiction books
Debut books